Mokum Records is a Dutch independent record label specialising in early hardcore and hardcore releases. They have released about 100 single and EP vinyl records between 1993 and 1999 and more than 80 since 2004.

Fred Berkhout (Freddy B) created Mokum Records in 1993 as a joke response to another record label, Rotterdam Records. The label was originally part of the record store Boudisque Records, but was later merged with Roadrunner Records - part of The Island Def Jam Music Group - who closed the label in 1998 because vinyl cost more than it yielded and decided to stop releasing with the medium. The label was revived by Freddy B in 2004 due to the re-emergence of the hardcore scene in the early 2000s, especially with gabber's resurgence in popularity in 2002. (catalog releases starting at 100 reflect this).

Mokum Records achieved chart success all over the world in 1995 with Technohead and their No. 1 hit "I Wanna Be a Hippy", the No. 1 hit "Have You Ever Been Mellow" by the Party Animals, and Technohead's "Happy Birthday", which followed in 1996. The Party Animals would also go on to have two more consecutive #1 hits with "Hava Naquila" and "Aquarius", making them the first ever Dutch act to have their first three singles top the Dutch charts. As well as this success, they are also renowned for their series of compilation albums called "Fucking Hardcore." The series started in 1995 at the height of the label's popularity and finished with "Fucking Hardcore No. 8" in 1998; however, the series was revived in 2016. The label was home to many successful producers and DJs such as Chosen Few, Flamman & Abraxas, Tellurian, The Prophet, Speedfreak, DJ Dano, Scott Brown and Liza N Eliaz.

Overview
Mokum is noted for adopting anti-Fascist statements or notices on its record sleeves in response to Neo-Nazi activity on the early Dutch rave scene. All Mokum releases carry the slogan "UNITED GABBERS AGAINST RACISM & FASCISM" and several artists have released tracks that vocally speak out against racism.

The record company is named after Mokum which is the Yiddish name for the center borough of Amsterdam and was originally used by the Jewish community and was later added to the local Amsterdam dialect.

In 1996, DJ Dano launched a sublabel to Mokum called "Fukem." Fukem was strictly for material that had faster tempos and harder material than material that would be released on the main label. Along with DJ Dano, artists that released under Fukem included Aggroman, Narcanosis, Deadly Buda & the Superstars of Death, and even Technohead had one release on the sublabel with "Cocaine", a collaboration with Elvis Jackson. The sublabel was short-lived, having only six official releases, and became inactive in 1997.

On 2 December 2016, Mokum, in collaboration with Overdrive Records, announced on their Facebook page that they were reviving their "Fucking Hardcore" series after an 18-year hiatus with #9 being released on vinyl in 2017, a first for the series. Another first for the series came in 2018 when "Fucking Hardcore #10" and "Fucking Hardcore #11" were released digitally on available music sites, which had never been done previous.

See also
 Early hardcore
 Happy hardcore
 List of record labels
 Make 'Em Mokum Crazy (1996)

References

External links
 Official Mokum Records Website
 Mokum discography at Hardcore Underground
 Mokum history and discography at discogs.com
 Connected DJ @ Cenobite

Dutch record labels
Record labels established in 1993
Record labels disestablished in 1999
Record labels established in 2004
Re-established companies
Electronic dance music record labels